When the Smoke Clears is the fifth studio album by American rock band Hinder. The album was released on May 12, 2015 by their new label The End Records and is their first album without former lead singer and founding member Austin John Winkler. It is also their first album to feature Marshal Dutton as the new lead vocalist.

Production
After news broke that Austin Winkler left the band in November 2013 Hinder was extremely inactive on social media and their website. The group stayed silent until July 8, 2014 when they posted a video on Facebook apologizing for their inactivity and announced that they had been writing songs for a new album while they searched for a new lead singer. The band played a string of shows throughout the late summer of 2014 with Nolan Neal as vocalist. The first single off the then-untitled fifth album, titled "Hit The Ground," was released on November 24, 2014. On January 20, 2015 Hinder officially announced that Marshal Dutton, who had written and produced music with Hinder since 2009, was their new vocalist. The other members of Hinder said that Nolan Neal's voice was "too country" for the band's rock image. After the addition of Dutton, the band released a rerecorded version of "Hit The Ground" with Dutton on vocals.

Release
Hinder held an online competition on their social media sites for their fans to help name the new album. On December 9, 2014 the band announced that When the Smoke Clears had been chosen as the album's title, which would be released in the spring of 2015. 
To help promote the album the band started a Pledge Music campaign.

On March 17, 2015 the band released the song "Rather Hate Than Hurt" via Loudwire, making it the second song to be released from the band since Winkler's departure. The band also revealed the release date of the album to be May 12, 2015.

"Intoxicated" was released on May 3, 2015 to radio mainstream rock stations as a third single.

"Letting Go" was released on December 7, 2015 as the band's fourth single.

Track listing

Personnel
Marshal Dutton – lead vocals
Joe Garvey – lead guitar, backing vocals
Mark King – rhythm guitar, backing vocals
Mike Rodden – bass 
Cody Hanson – drums

Charts

References

External links
Blabbermouth.net

Hinder albums
2015 albums
The End Records albums